Grant Acedrex is a medieval chess variant dating back to the time of King Alfonso X of Castile. It appears in the Libro de los Juegos of 1283.

Rules
The following rules are from the reconstruction given on the website of Jean-Louis Cazaux, based on work by him and Sonja Musser. The game is played on a 12×12 board.

King
The king moves as like modern king. Its Betza notation is thus K. Castling does not exist in Grant Acedrex However, on its first move, a king may make a diagonal or orthogonal leap of two squares (Betza notation AD) in addition to its normal moves.

Aanca
The aanca (a beautiful and fearsome bird, very similar to a roc, sometimes translated incorrectly as gryphon) moves one square diagonally (like a ferz), before optionally continuing orthogonally outward any number of squares. Its Betza notation is t[FR].

Unicornio
The unicornio (the illustration on the medieval codex shows a rhinoceros's head) moves like a modern knight, before continuing diagonally outward any number of squares. (In H. J. R. Murray's translation, its first move is a non-capturing knight move, after which it acts as a bishop for the rest of the game.) Its Betza notation is t[NB].

Lion
The lion moves like a threeleaper or a camel, and can jump (a combined (3,0)-leaper and (3,1)-leaper). (In Murray's translation, it can only move as a threeleaper.) Its Betza notation is HL.

Giraffe
The giraffe moves like a zebra, a (3,2)-leaper. (In Murray's translation, it is a (4,1)-leaper.) Its Betza notation is J.

Crocodile
The crocodile moves like the modern bishop. Its Betza notation is B.

Rook
rook moves like the modern rook. Its Betza notation is R.

Pawn
The pawn moves like the modern pawn, but cannot make an initial double step or capture en passant. Its Betza notation is mfWcfF. When it reaches the other end of the board (the twelfth rank for White, or the first rank for Black), it promotes to the piece that was originally there: the exception is that a pawn promoting on the g-file becomes an aanca. For example, a pawn promoting on the a-file would become a rook.

Game end
In Grant Acedrex, a player wins by either checkmating or stalemating the opponent. A player can also win by capturing all the opponent's pieces leaving him with a bare king.

Using dice
The game could be sped up by using eight-sided dice to dictate which piece could move that turn, ranking them in the order: king (8), aanca (7), unicornio (6), rook (5), lion (4), crocodile (3), giraffe (2), and pawn (1).

Computer engines
The multi-variant Chess engines Fairy-Max and Postduif can play Grant Acedrex under the XBoard or WinBoard user interface.

References

 Los libros de acedrex dados e tablas: Historical, artistic and metaphyisical dimensions of Alfonso X’s Book of Games (PDF), Sonja Musser Golladay, PhD dissertation, University of Arizona, 2007
 Grant Acedrex by Jean-Louis Cazaux
 Grant Acedrex at The Chess Variant Pages

Games related to chaturanga
Abstract strategy games
History of chess
Medieval chess
13th century in Castile